, also known by its Japanese title SHIO GIN NAN ( = salted ginkgo nuts), is the sixth studio album by the Toshiko Akiyoshi – Lew Tabackin Big Band. Released in 1978, the album received the 1979 Silver Disk award from Japan's Swing Journal magazine.

Track listing
All songs are composed by Toshiko Akiyoshi.

Personnel
 Toshiko Akiyoshi – piano
 Lew Tabackin – tenor saxophone and flute
 Tom Peterson – tenor saxophone
 Gary Foster – alto saxophone
 Dick Spencer – alto saxophone
 Bill Byrne – baritone saxophone
 Steven Huffsteter – trumpet
 Bobby Shew – trumpet
 Mike Price – trumpet
 Larry Ford – trumpet
 Bill Reichenbach Jr. – trombone
 Randy Aldcroft – trombone
 Rick Culver – trombone
 Phil Teele – bass trombone
 Mike Richmond – bass
 Peter Donald – drums

References

External links
[ Allmusic]

Toshiko Akiyoshi – Lew Tabackin Big Band albums
1978 albums
Baystate Records albums